Michael J. Trost was a Major League Baseball catcher. He played for the St. Louis Brows of the American Association in 17 games during the 1890 season and for the Louisville Colonels of the National League in 3 games in 1895. He also had an extensive minor league baseball career that lasted from 1888 until 1900. He was the player/manager for the Newport News Shipbuilders of the Virginia League in 1900.

Sources

Major League Baseball catchers
St. Louis Browns (AA) players
Louisville Colonels players
Baseball players from Pennsylvania
1866 births
1901 deaths
19th-century baseball players
Fort Worth Panthers players
Evansville Hoosiers players
Peoria Canaries players
Peoria Distillers players
Aurora Indians players
Mobile Blackbirds players
Reading Actives players
Altoona Mud Turtles players
Petersburg Farmers players
Mobile Bluebirds players
Nashville Seraphs players
Detroit Tigers (Western League) players
Youngstown Little Giants players
Newport News Shipbuilders players
Minor league baseball managers
Baseball player-managers